Daphne odora, winter daphne, is a species of flowering plant in the family Thymelaeaceae, native to China, later spread to Japan and Korea. It is an evergreen shrub, grown for its very fragrant, fleshy, pale-pink, tubular flowers, each with four spreading lobes, and for its glossy foliage. It rarely fruits, producing red berries after flowering.

The Latin specific epithet odora means "fragrant".

It grows best in fertile, slightly acid, peaty, well-drained soils. In Korea, the plant is also poetically called "chullihyang" – a thousand-mile scent – referring to the fragrance of the foliage. In Japan, the plant is more commonly known as "jinchoge".

Plants are not long lived, usually lasting eight to ten years. Daphne generally do not react well to root disturbance, and may transplant badly. D. odora is also susceptible to virus infection, which causes leaf mottling.

All parts of the plant are poisonous to humans and a range of domestic animals and some people experience dermatitis from contact with the sap.

Daphne odora is propagated by semi-ripe cuttings in summer.

Cultivars
D. odora f. rosacea has white and pink flowers.
D. odora f. rubra has dark red-pink flowers with reduced fragrance.
D. odora 'Aureomarginata' has yellow edged leaves, and is hardier and more suitable to cultivation than the plain-leaved forms.

References 

odora